Mustafa Musa (born 25 July 1947) is a Ugandan long-distance runner. He competed in the marathon at the 1968 Summer Olympics.

References

1947 births
Living people
Athletes (track and field) at the 1968 Summer Olympics
Ugandan male long-distance runners
Ugandan male marathon runners
Olympic athletes of Uganda
Athletes (track and field) at the 1970 British Commonwealth Games
Athletes (track and field) at the 1974 British Commonwealth Games
Commonwealth Games competitors for Uganda
Place of birth missing (living people)
20th-century Ugandan people